Blue to the 'Bone is an album by organist Jimmy McGriff recorded in 1988 and released on the Milestone label.

Reception 

Allmusic's Michael Erlewine said: "The trombone is not that often found in the small-organ combo format and may not appeal to everyone. Smooth, yet funky".

Track listing
 "Ain't That Funk for You" (Al Grey) – 6:25
 "For All We Know" (J. Fred Coots, Sam M. Lewis) – 5:10
 "Don't Get Around Much Anymore" (Duke Ellington, Bob Russell) – 10:18
 "Secret Love" (Sammy Fain, Paul Francis Webster) – 9:03
 "Hangin' In" (Jimmy McGriff, Melvin Sparks) – 7:43
 "After the Dark" (Reggy Marks) – 5:33

Personnel
Jimmy McGriff – organ
Al Grey – trombone
Bill Easley – alto saxophone, tenor saxophone
Melvin Sparks – guitar
Bernard Purdie − drums

References

 

Milestone Records albums
Jimmy McGriff albums
1988 albums
Albums produced by Bob Porter (record producer)
Albums recorded at Van Gelder Studio